The Hong Kong women's national under-18 volleyball team represents Hong Kong, China in women's under-18 volleyball events, it is controlled and managed by the Volleyball Association of Hong Kong, China (VBAHK) that is a member of Asian volleyball body Asian Volleyball Confederation (AVC) and the international volleyball body government the Fédération Internationale de Volleyball (FIVB).

Team

Coaching staff

Current squad
The following 18 players were called up for the 2018 Asian Girls' U17 Volleyball Championship in Nakhon Pathom, Thailand.

Competition history

Youth Olympic Games
  2010 – Did not enter

World Championship
 1989 – Did not qualify
 1991 – Did not qualify
 1993 – Did not qualify
 1995 – Did not qualify
 1997 – Did not enter
 1999 – Did not enter
 2001 – Did not enter
 2003 – Did not enter
 2005 – Did not enter
 2007 – Did not enter
 2009 – Did not enter
 2011 – Did not enter
 2013 – Did not qualify
 2015 – Did not qualify
 2017 – Did not enter
 2019 – Did not qualify

Asian Championship
 1997 – Did not enter
 1999 – Did not enter
 2001 – Did not enter
 2003 – Did not enter
 2005 – Did not enter
 2007 – Did not enter
 2008 – Did not enter
 2010 – Did not enter
 2012 – 8th 
 2014 – 9th
 2017 – 6th
 2018 – 12th

External links
Official website

volleyball
Women's volleyball in Hong Kong
National women's under-18 volleyball teams